() is a large public square and transport hub in the central Mitte district of Berlin.

 is reputedly the most visited area of Berlin, beating Friedrichstrasse and City West.

History

Early history to the 18th century
A hospital stood at the location of present-day  since the 13th century. Named  (St. George), the hospital gave its name to the nearby  (George Gate) of the Berlin city wall. Outside the city walls, this area was largely undeveloped until around 1400, when the first settlers began building thatched cottages.

After the Thirty Years' War, the city wall was strengthened. From 1658 to 1683, a citywide fortress was constructed to plans by the Linz master builder, . Within the new fortress, many of the historic city wall gates were closed. For example, the southeastern  Gate was closed but the Georgian Gate remained open, making the Georgian Gate an even more important entrance to the city.

In 1681, the trade of cattle and pig fattening was banned within the city. Frederick William, the Great Elector, granted cheaper plots of land, waiving the basic interest rate, in the area in front of the Georgian Gate. Settlements grew rapidly and a weekly cattle market was established on the square in front of the Gate.

The area developed into a suburb – the  – which continued to flourish into the late 17th century. Unlike the southwestern suburbs which were strictly and geometrically planned, the suburbs in the northeast (and the ) proliferated without plan. Despite a building ban imposed in 1691, more than 600 houses existed in the area by 1700.

At that time, the George Gate was a rectangular gatehouse with a tower. Next to the tower stood a remaining tower from the original medieval city walls. The upper floors of the gatehouse served as the city jail. A drawbridge spanned the moat and the gate was locked at nightfall by the garrison using heavy oak planks.

A highway ran through the cattle market to the northeast towards . To the right stood the George chapel, an orphanage and a hospital that was donated by the Elector Sophie Dorothea in 1672. Next to the chapel stood a dilapidated medieval plague house which was demolished in 1716.

By the end of the 17th century, 600 to 700 families lived in this area. They included butchers, cattle herders, shepherds and dairy farmers. The George chapel was upgraded to the George church and received its own preacher.

(1701–1805) 

The  suburb was renamed  (or 'royal suburbs' short).

In 1734, the Berlin Customs Wall, which initially consisted of a ring of palisade fences, was reinforced and grew to encompass the old city and its suburbs, including . This resulted in the King's Gate losing importance as an entry point for goods into the city. The gate was finally demolished in 1746.

By the end of the 18th century, the basic structure of the royal suburbs of the  had been developed. It consisted of irregular-shaped blocks of buildings running along the historic highways which once carried goods in various directions out of the gate.

Soon, military facilities came to dominate the area, such as the 1799–1800 military parade grounds designed by David Gilly. The southern part of the later  was separated from traffic by trees and served as a parade ground, whereas the northern half remained a market.

Between 1752 and 1755, the writer  lived in a house on Alexanderplatz. In 1771, a new stone bridge (the ) was built over the moat and in 1777 a colonnade-lined row of shops was constructed by architect .

(1805–1900) 
On 25 October 1805 the Russian Tsar Alexander I was welcomed to the city on the parade grounds in front of the old King's Gate. To mark this occasion, on 2 November, King Frederick William III ordered the square to be renamed :
The foundation stone was laid on 31 August 1823 and the opening ceremony occurred on 4 August 1824. Sales were poor, forcing the theatre to close on 3 June 1851. Thereafter, the building was used for wool storage, then as a tenement building, and finally as an inn called  until the building's demolition in 1932.

During these years,  was populated by fish wives, water carriers, sand sellers, rag-and-bone men, knife sharpeners and day laborers.

Novelist and poet , who worked in the vicinity in a nearby pharmacy, participated in the construction of barricades and later described how he used materials from the  Theater to barricade .

The  continued to grow throughout the 19th century, with three-storey developments already existing at the beginning of the century and fourth storeys being constructed from the middle of the century. By the end of the century, most of the buildings were already five storeys high. The large factories and military facilities gave way to housing developments (mainly rental housing for the factory workers who had just moved into the city) and trading houses.

In 1883–1884, the Grand Hotel, a neo-Renaissance building with 185 rooms and shops beneath was constructed. From 1886 to 1890,  built the police headquarters, a huge brick building whose tower on the northern corner dominated the building.

During the end of the 19th century, the emerging private traffic and the first horse bus lines dominated the northern part of the square, the southern part (the former parade ground) remained quiet, having green space elements added by garden director  in 1889. The northwest of the square contained a second, smaller green space where, in 1895, the  copper Berolina statue by sculptor  was erected.

Between Empire and the Nazi era (1900–1940) 
At the beginning of the 20th century,  experienced its heyday. It was announced as " as upscale entertainment with artistic ambitions. Emperor-loyal and market-oriented stands the uncritical amusement in the foreground."

In October 1905, the first section of the  department store opened to the public.

The building housed the teachers' library which survived two world wars, and today is integrated into the library for educational historical research. The rear of the property contained the association's administrative building, a hotel for members and an exhibition hall.

The First Ordinary Congress of the Communist Workers Party of Germany was held in the nearby  restaurant, 1–4 August 1920.

's position as a main transport and traffic hub continued to fuel its development. In addition to the three  underground lines, long-distance trains and  trains ran along the 's viaduct arches.

Many of the buildings and rail bridges surrounding the platz bore large billboards that illuminated the night. The Berlin cigarette company Manoli had a famous billboard at the time which contained a ring of neon tubes that constantly circled a black ball. The proverbial "" of those years was characterized as "". Writer  wrote a poem referencing the advert, and the composer Rudolf Nelson made the legendary  with the dancer Lucie Berber.

One of Berlin's largest air-raid shelters during the Second World War was situated under .

The war reached  in early April 1945. The Berolina statue had already been removed in 1944 and probably melted down for use in arms production.

The  had entrenched itself within the tunnels of the underground system. Hours before fighting ended in Berlin on 2 May 1945, troops of the SS detonated explosives inside the north–south  tunnel under the  Canal to slow the advance of the Red Army towards Berlin's city centre. The entire tunnel flooded, as well as large sections of the  network via connecting passages at the  underground station. Many of those seeking shelter in the tunnels were killed.

Demolition and reconstruction (1945–1964)
Before a planned reconstruction of the entire  could take place, all the war ruins needed to be demolished and cleared away. A popular black market emerged within the ruined area, which the police raided several times a day.

One structure demolished after World War II was the 'Rote Burg', a red brick building with round arches, previously used as police and Gestapo headquarters. The huge construction project began in 1886 and was completed in 1890; it was one of Berlin's largest buildings. The 'castle' suffered extensive damage during 1944-45 and was demolished in 1957. The site on the southwest corner of Alexanderplatz remained largely unused as a carpark until the Alexa shopping centre opened in 2007. 

Reconstruction planning for post-war Berlin gave priority to the dedicated space to accommodate the rapidly growing motor traffic in inner-city thoroughfares.

East Germany

 has been subject to redevelopment several times in its history, most recently during the 1960s, when it was turned into a pedestrian zone and enlarged as part of the German Democratic Republic's redevelopment of the city centre.

During the Peaceful Revolution of 1989, the  demonstration on 4 November 1989 was the largest demonstration in the history of the German Democratic Republic. Protests starting 15 October and peaked on 4 November with an estimated 200,000 participants who called on the government of the ruling Socialist Unity Party of Germany to step down and demanded a free press, the opening of the borders and their right to travel. The protests continued and culminated in the unexpected Fall of the Berlin Wall on 9 November 1989.

After German reunification (1989)

Ever since German reunification,  has undergone a gradual process of change with many of the surrounding buildings being renovated. After the political turnaround in the wake of the fall of the Berlin Wall, socialist urban planning and architecture of the 1970s no longer corresponded to the current ideas of an inner-city square. Investors demanded planning security for their construction projects. After initial discussions with the public, the goal quickly arose to reinstate 's tram network for better connections to surrounding city quarters. In 1993, an urban planning ideas competition for architects took place to redesign the square and its surrounding area. 

In the first phase, there were 16 submissions, five of which were selected for the second phase of the competition. These five architects had to adapt their plans to detailed requirements. For example, the return of the Alex's trams was planned, with the implementation to be made in several stages.

The winner, who was determined on 17 September 1993, was the Berlin architect . The  and the  – both listed buildings – would form the southwestern boundary. The proposal of the architecture firm Kny & Weber, which was strongly based on the horseshoe shape of Wagner, finally won the third place.

In 1993, architect 's master plan for a major redevelopment including the construction of several skyscrapers was published. 

21st century

The purchase contracts between investors and the Senate Department for Urban Development were signed on 23 May 2002, thus laying the foundations for the development.

The CUBIX multiplex cinema (CineStar Cubix am Alexanderplatz, styled CUBIX), which opened in November 2000, joined the team of Berlin International Film Festival cinemas in 2007, and the festival shows films on three of its screens.

Renovation of the  department store began in 2004, led by Berlin professor of architecture,  and his son .

Beginning with the reconstruction of the  department store in 2004, and the biggest underground railway station of Berlin, some buildings were redesigned and new structures built on the square's south-eastern side. Sidewalks were expanded to shrink one of the avenues, a new underground garage was built, and commuter tunnels meant to keep pedestrians off the streets were removed. Between 2005 and 2006,  was renovated and later became a branch of the clothing chain, C&A.

This route was originally to be opened in 2000 but was postponed several times. After further delays caused by the 2006 FIFA World Cup, the route opened on 30 May 2007.

In February 2006, the redesign of the walk-in plaza began. The redevelopment plans were provided by the architecture firm Gerkan, Marg and Partners and the Hamburg-based company . The final plans emerged from a design competition launched by the state of Berlin in 2004. However, the paving work was temporarily interrupted a few months after the start of construction by the 2006 FIFA World Cup and all excavation pits had to be provisionally asphalted over. The construction work could only be completed at the end of 2007.

The  was given a pavement of yellow granite, bordered by grey mosaic paving around the buildings. Wall AG modernized the 1920s-era underground toilets at a cost of 750,000 euros. The total redesign cost amounted to around 8.7 million euros.

On 12 September 2007 the Alexa shopping centre opened. With a  sales area, it is one of the largest shopping centres in Berlin.

In May 2007, the Texas property development company Hines began building a six-story commercial building named . The building was opened on 25 March 2009.

The opening took place on 26 November 2010.

As of 2014 it as assessed that due to a lack of demand the skyscrapers planned in 1993 were unlikely to be constructed. 

In January 2014, a 39-story residential tower designed by Frank Gehry was announced, but this project was put on hold in 2018.
The  area is the largest area for crime in Berlin.

Today and future plans
Despite the reconstruction of the tram line crossing, it has retained its socialist character, including the much-graffitied , a popular venue.

 is reputedly the most visited area of Berlin, beating Friedrichstrasse and City West.

 is also the name of the S-Bahn and U-Bahn stations there. It is one of Berlin's largest and most important transportation hubs, being a meeting place of three subway lines, three  lines, and many tram and bus lines, as well as regional trains.

It also accommodates the Park Inn Berlin and the World Time Clock, a continually rotating installation that shows the time throughout the globe, the House of Travel, and 's  (House of Teachers)'.

If and when this plan will be implemented is unclear, especially since the hotel tower received a new façade as recently as in 2005, and the occupancy rates of the hotel are very good. The previous main tenant of the development, Saturn, moved into the  building in March 2009. In 2014, Primark opened a branch inside the hotel building.

The state of Berlin has announced that it will not enforce the corresponding urban development contracts against the market. Of the 13 planned skyscrapers, 10 remained as of 2008, after modifications to the plans – eight of which had construction rights. Some investors in the Alexa shopping centre announced several times since 2007 that they would sell their respective shares in the plot to an investor interested in building a high-rise building.

The first concrete plans for the construction of a high-rise were made by Hines, the investor behind die mitte. On 12 September 2011, a slightly modified development plan was presented, which provided for a residential tower housing 400 apartments. In early 2013, the development plan was opened to the public.

Architects, city planners and Senate officials held open discussions. On that occasion, however, it was reiterated that the plans for high-rise developments were not up for debate. According to the master plan of the architect , up to eleven huge buildings will continue to be built, which will house a mixture of shops and apartments.

On 29 of the 35 floors, 377 apartments are to be built. It would be located next to the Alexa shopping centre, with a planned completion date of 2021.

Roads and public transport 
During the post-war reconstruction of the 1960s,  was completely pedestrianized. Since then, trams were reintroduced to the area in 1998.

Several tram and bus lines also service the area.

The following main roads connect to :
 Northwest:  (federal highways B 2 and B 5)
 Northeast:  (B 2 and B 5)
 Southeast:  (B 1)
 Southwest (in front of the  station, in the pedestrian zone): 

These include (clockwise from north to south-east):
  /  –  –  (to Bundesstraße 96a)
  – intersection  –  (main road 109 to the  triangle at the )
  /  –  (B 2) – (intersection ) –  (B 2 via  to the  junction at )

 (B 1 and B 5) –  –  /  –  (B 1 and B 5 to  junction at )

Structures

World Clock

Berolina

Fountain of Friendship 
Its water basin has a diameter of 23 meters, it is 6.20 meters high and is built from embossed copper, glass, ceramics and enamel. The water spurts from the highest point and then flows down in spirals over 17 shells, which each have a diameter between one and four meters.

Other 

Image gallery

Further reading
 Weszkalnys, Gisa (2010). Berlin, Alexanderplatz: Transforming Place in a Unified Germany. Berghahn Books.

External links

 Alexanderplatz – Overview of the changes

References 

Articles containing video clips
Mitte
Squares in Berlin
Zones of Berlin
Cremer & Wolffenstein